The Florida Election Commission (FEC) is an organisation set up in 1973 to enforce campaign finance laws in the United States' state of Florida. "The commission is composed of nine members appointed by the governor."

See also
 Elections in Florida

References

Further reading

External links

Election commissions in the United States
Organizations established in 1973
Politics of Florida
1973 establishments in Florida